The 1996 Campeonato Brasileiro Série A was the 40th edition of the Campeonato Brasileiro Série A, was played between August 8 and December 15, 1996. It had 24 teams and divided into two stages. In the first one, every team played against each other once. After 23 rounds, top eight clubs qualified to next stage, and the bottom two were supposed to be relegated, but CBF decided to keep Fluminense and Bragantino in Série A after the season was over due to the leak of transcripts of recorded telephone conversations broadcast in the most popular Brazilian TV suggested that, during the 1996 season, Atlético-PR and Corinthians general managers Mario Celso Petraglia and Alberto Dualib had conversations with the head of officials of Brazilian football to influence referee appointments. The scandal resulted in a mild individual punishment only, not like similar scandal in Italy where Juventus was relegated and others important clubs were punished.   

Final stage was played in elimination system with home-and-away matches. The club with better record during first stage had the advantage to qualify in case of a draw. In the end, Grêmio won their second championship in history based on this rule. They were defeated by runners-up Portuguesa 2–0 at Morumbi Stadium, but came back on second leg, winning by the same score at their home ground, Olímpico Stadium in Porto Alegre.

Standings and results

First stage

Final stage

Grêmio won based on their better record during first stage.

Top scorers

1
1996